Szczepanów  is a village in the administrative district of Gmina Brzesko, within Brzesko County, Lesser Poland Voivodeship, in southern Poland.

The village has a population of 949.

It was the birthplace of Stanislaus of Szczepanów - 11th Century Bishop of Kraków who was martyred by the Polish king Bolesław II the Bold and became venerated in the Roman Catholic Church as Saint Stanislaus the Martyr.

Landmarks
 Church of Mary Magdalene. Founded by Odrowąża Yvonne Bishop of Cracow. In the thirteenth century Vincent of Kielcza, described this building as a wooden structure but by 1470 Jan Długosz described a stone church. The church building was damaged on 23 November 1914 as a result of World War I.
 The church of St. Mary Magdalene and St. Stanisława is a Gothic Revival building, designed by architect and professor at the Lwów Polytechnic, Jan Sas-Zubrzycki. It was built between 1911–1914 and has a five-storey tower.
 Szczepanów Market.
 The historic parish cemetery and also a military cemetery from World War I.

References

Villages in Brzesko County
Kraków Voivodeship (14th century – 1795)
Kingdom of Galicia and Lodomeria
Kraków Voivodeship (1919–1939)